John Bolton (born December 29, 1965) is an American actor and Broadway regular. Bolton is best known for originating the role of "The Old Man" (Mr. Parker) in the Broadway show A Christmas Story: The Musical.  He portrayed Vlad Popov in the 2017 Broadway production of Anastasia.

Career
Bolton originated the role of "The Old Man" (Mr. Parker) in A Christmas Story: The Musical on Broadway, running from November 19, 2012, to December 30, 2012, and repeated this starring role in Boston, Hartford and in December 2013 at Madison Square Garden.

He appeared in the Broadway revival of Dames at Sea, starring as The Captain/Hennesey. The musical ran from October 22, 2015, to January 3, 2016.

His other theatre credits include many Broadway musicals that have won the Tony Award including original productions of Curtains with David Hyde Pierce; Spamalot with Tim Curry, David Hyde Pierce, and Sara Ramirez, directed by Mike Nichols; Contact directed by Susan Stroman; and Titanic; and revivals of Damn Yankees and How to Succeed in Business with Matthew Broderick, with Bolton eventually playing the role of Finch opposite Sarah Jessica Parker.

A sought-after cabaret performer, Bolton has also appeared in many concert performances including Downton Abbey at 54 Below (2013), Titanic reunion at Lincoln Center Avery Fisher Hall (2014), and Guys and Dolls (2011) and the Family Holiday Concert with the New York Pops at Carnegie Hall. The New York Times called his performance in Guys and Dolls a "stand-out." Bolton is a regular soloist with the New York Pops, and he has headlined three sold-out concerts at Carnegie Hall. He performed in the concert series "Broadway in the Boros" at the Queens' Socrates Sculpture Park on July 21, 2017.

He has performed in television shows and many TV commercials. Most recently he was seen on Elementary, Madam Secretary and Unbreakable Kimmy Schmidt. He played the recurring character D.A. John Summerhill on the soap opera All My Children in 2006. He also appeared in "Loose Lips", a 2014 episode of Blue Bloods, and "Vacancy", a 2006 episode of Law & Order: Criminal Intent; and he played Bruce Caplan on the television series Gossip Girl.  Bolton has also made guest star appearances as Carl Switzer on the HBO television series Boardwalk Empire, and as Jason Doyle on the television series The Good Wife. He also appeared in the third season of Submissions Only and the short Russian Broadway Shut Down.

He is an adjunct professor at Pace University, teaching acting.

Personal life
He was born in Rochester, New York and grew up in LeRoy, New York.

Major theatre credits

Broadway
Sources: Broadwayworld IBDB

 Anastasia, Broadhurst Theatre 2017-2019
 Dames at Sea, Helen Hayes Theatre 2015 
 A Christmas Story: The Musical, 2012
 Curtains, 2007-2008
 Spamalot, 2005–2006 (Tony Award for Best Musical)
 Contact, 2000–2002 (Tony Award for Best Musical)
 Titanic, 1997–1999 (Tony Award for Best Musical)
 How to Succeed in Business Without Really Trying, 1995–1996
 Damn Yankees, 1994–1995

Off-Broadway
Soure: Broadwayworld
 Pageant: The Musical, 2014
 The Last Smoker in America, 2012
 Five Course Love, 2005

Other
Show Boat at the San Francisco Opera directed by Francesca Zambello with Bill Irwin, Harriet Harris, and Patricia Racette (2014)
Young Frankenstein at the Ogunquit Playhouse and Gateway Playhouse (2013) as Frederick Frankenstein
Anywhere I Wander: The Frank Loesser Songbook, 2012 concert debut with the New York Philharmonic
Same Time, Next Year with Eve Plumb, September 2011 at the Surflight Theatre, Beach Haven, NJ
A Christmas Story: The Musical, Seattle, 5th Avenue Theatre (2010); 5 City National Tour (2011)
The Music Man, May - June 2011, Geva Theatre Center, Rochester, New York
 Einstein's Dreams, 2009, Benefit Concert, Symphony Space, New York City
 It's Only Life, revue by John Bucchino, Samuel Beckett Theatre, New York City, July to August 2004
 Señor Discretion Himself, April - May, 2004, Arena Stage (Washington, DC)
The Opposite of Sex, October 2004, Magic Theatre, San Francisco

Filmography
Source: TV Guide

 Madam Secretary 2017 (TV series): Attorney General Nolan, episode"Convergence"
 Elementary 2017 (TV series): Mr. Charles, episode "Be My Guest"
 Unbreakable Kimmy Schmidt 2015 (TV series): Bus Driver
 Blue Bloods 2014 (TV series): Tom Pincus, episode "Loose Lips"
 The Good Wife 2011 (TV series): Jason Doyle, episode "Get a Room"
 Boardwalk Empire (2011) (TV series): Carl Switzer
 Gossip Girl (2012) (TV series): Bruce Caplan, episodes "Where the Vile Things Are" and "Con Heir"
 The Savages (2007 film): Man in Mall Lot
 Law & Order: Criminal Intent (2006) (TV series): Episode: "Vacancy"
 All My Children (2006 Season): D.A. John Summerhill
 As the World Turns (1996) (TV series): Malcolm Twist

Awards
 2017 Outer Critics Circle Award Best Featured Actor in a Musical (Anastasia) (nominee)
 2017 Rivera Award (formerly Astaire Award) Outstanding Male Dancer in a Broadway Show (Anastasia) (nominee)
 2016 Astaire Award nomination, Outstanding Ensemble In A Broadway Show Dames at Sea
 2016 Connecticut Critics Circle nomination - Best Featured Actor in a Musical Anastasia
 2014 IRNE Award (Independent Reviewers of New England) nomination for Best Visiting Performer in A Christmas Story: The Musical
 Named one of The Boston Globe Top Ten Performance of the year for A Christmas Story: The Musical
 58th Annual Drama Desk (2013) Nomination for Best Featured Actor in A Christmas Story: The Musical
 2012 Footlight Award for Best Actor from the Seattle Times for A Christmas Story: The Musical
 2008 City Spirit Award in Rochester, New York
 2004 BAT (Bay Area Theatre) nomination for The Opposite of Sex

References

External links

Photos of John Bolton at Broadway World
Video interview about Curtains at theatre.com
Interview in Theater Mania
Article by Bolton on theater previews

1965 births
Living people
Male actors from Rochester, New York
American male stage actors
American male soap opera actors
American male television actors